Moab Regional Hospital is a non-profit, critical access hospital with a Level IV Trauma Center in Moab, Utah.  It opened on February 14, 2011.

Services
The Moab Regional Hospital offers the following services:  Emergency Department, urgent care, dermatology, general/orthopedic surgical services, primary care, radiology, obstetrical services, cancer therapy, laboratory, and visiting specialists in oncology, podiatry, cardiology, urology, neurology, gynecology and plastic surgery. The hospital has a helipad located on the northeast side of the hospital.

External links

References

Buildings and structures in Moab, Utah
Hospitals in Utah
Hospitals established in 2011
2011 establishments in Utah